John Dudley (c. 1573 – c. 1622) was an English politician.

He was a member (MP) of the Parliament of England for Carlisle in 1601.

References

1570s births
1620s deaths
People from Carlisle, Cumbria
English MPs 1601
16th-century English politicians